Repalle Shiva Praveen Kumar (born 23 November 1967) is a former officer of Indian Police Service and served as the secretary of Telangana Social Welfare Residential Educational Institutions Society and Telangana Tribal Welfare Residential Educational Institutions Society.

Early life 
Praveen pursued studies in veterinary science from Andhra Pradesh Agricultural University, his faculty included Professor T. D. J. Nagabhushanam, among others.  He belongs to the Indian Police Service batch of 1995. He holds a master's degree in Public Administration from Harvard University's Kennedy School under a Edward S Mason fellowship.

Career 
During Praveen Kumar's tenure as the secretary of TSWREIS and TTWREIS, these residential schools being run for students belonging to marginalised sections has scripted many success stories and concentrated on whole some personality development of the students. He held the role for about 10 years.

On 19 July 2021, he announced voluntary retirement and resigned from his post as secretary of TSWREIS and TTWREIS.

Transformation of Social Welfare Residential Schools
Praveen Kumar introduced P5 Model into Social Welfare Residential Schools. In this model, he added several innovative and path breaking programmes like E-Plus Clubs, Voice for Girls, Horse riding, film making, music, dance, water sports, mountaineering, Ignitor, W Plus Clubs, Impact,  etc., for holistic development of the children. During his tenure TSWREI students had successfully launched two payloads Swaero Sat 1 and Swaero Sat 2. The SWAEROSAT-1 was designed to study cosmic radiation and ozone layer concentration at various altitudes. Swaero Sat 2 is an experimental payload built to study atmospheric pollutants like methane gas and carbon monoxide, and also radiation and temperature levels.

SWAEROEsS
Praveen Kumar is the founder and the guiding force to launch a payback movement called SWAEROES. Where SWAEROES stands for Social Welfare Aeroes (Greek for sky), it means that sky is the limit and there is no reverse gear or no looking back or no slowing down. Swaeroes student not only focused in academics and focusing success in arts, cultural programs, sports and games. Springer Publications has published the work of Praveen Kumar in its series Empowering Teachers to Build a Better World. His work is selected as one among the six nations shortlisted across the world.

Criticism by right-wing groups 
In March 2021, a video went viral during an oath ceremony of a Swaero movement held at Dhulikatta Buddhist Shrine in Peddapalli district. In the video Praveen Kumar was seen repeating "Budha Vandanam", vows taken by B. R. Ambedkar when he converted to Buddhism, which include denouncing faith in certain Hindu gods. The video was circulated and he was criticised by right-wing groups. Telangana BJP politicians and Vishva Hindu Parishad members accused him of spreading sentiments against Hinduism among students using the Swaero movement. Praveen Kumar defended against the accusations and issued a statement saying Swaeroism is an inclusive ideology and they don't teach any prejudice against any religion. The statement also stated that they work for just and equal society in the country only through education, health awareness, scientific thinking and economic empowerment, not through hatred.

Politics 
On 8 August 2021, Kumar joined Bahujan Samaj Party, with a calling that it was time "Dalits and Bahujans strive to achieve political power" in the state.

Awards and honours 
Kumar has been awarded the President's Police Medal for meritorious and also awarded the Telangana Excellence Award by the government of Telangana on the eve of the 71st India's Independence Day.

References 

Indian police officers
Living people
Harvard Kennedy School alumni
1967 births
People from Telangana
Telugu people
Andhra Pradesh Police
Indian agriculturalists
Andhra Pradesh academics
Scientists from Hyderabad, India
Telangana Police